The City of Caloundra was a local government area about  north of Brisbane in the Sunshine Coast region of South East Queensland, Australia.

The City covered the urban localities of Caloundra and Kawana Waters and surrounding suburbs, the northern half of Bribie Island and the western hinterland towns of Landsborough, Maleny and Witta.

History 
In 1868, the Queensland Government opened up large areas of land for settlement in the Caloundra area which became home to pioneers and timber cutters seeking red cedar wood.

The area was originally incorporated as part of the Caboolture Division on 11 November 1879 under the Divisional Boards Act 1879. With the passage of the Local Authorities Act 1902, Caboolture Division became Shire of Caboolture on 31 March 1903.

On 22 February 1912, part of the Shire of Caboolture was split away and was proclaimed as the Shire of Landsborough. John Tytherleigh, a local businessman with stores in the area, was elected its first chairman and they quickly set to work building the (now heritage-listed) Landsborough Shire Council Chambers in Landsborough. It was reconstructed from local timbers under the guidance of architect Walter Voller in 1924, and the building is today used as a museum housing artefacts including former Premier Frank Nicklin's personal collection.

The first female councillor was Miriam Westaway (née Costello) who represented Division 5 from 29 April 1961 to 30 March 1973. She was one of the first teachers at Caloundra State School. She was active in community groups such as the RSL Women's Auxiliary and a founder of the Caloundra Branch of the Queensland Country Women's Association and the local branch of the Red Cross.

On 19 December 1987, the Shire of Landsborough was granted city status, and was renamed the City of Caloundra, reflecting the population boom in the coastal section of the City. The Council Chambers were relocated to Omrah Avenue, Caloundra, and Jack Beausang, the long-serving Chairman of the Shire of Landsborough, was sworn in as its first mayor. He retired undefeated on 17 March 1988, and Don Aldous was elected to replace him.

On 15 March 2008, under the Local Government (Reform Implementation) Act 2007 passed by the Parliament of Queensland on 10 August 2007, the City of Caloundra merged with the Shire of Noosa and the Shire of Maroochy to form the Sunshine Coast Region. However, in 2014, Shire of Noosa was re-established as independent of the Sunshine Coast Region.

Structure 
The Shire was subdivided into ten numbered divisions, each of which returned one councillor, and an elected mayor.

Towns and localities 
The City of Caloundra included the following settlements:

 Aroona
 Bald Knob
 Balmoral Ridge
 Battery Hill
 Beerburrum
 Beerwah
 Bells Creek
 Birtinya
 Bokarina
 Booroobin
 Bribie Island North
 Buddina
 Caloundra
 Caloundra West
 Cambroon
 Conondale

 Coochin Creek
 Crohamhurst
 Curramore
 Currimundi
 Diamond Valley
 Dicky Beach
 Elaman Creek
 Glass House Mountains
 Glenview
 Golden Beach
 Harper Creek
 Kidaman Creek1
 Kings Beach
 Landsborough
 Little Mountain
 Maleny

 Meridan Plains
 Minyama
 Moffat Beach
 Mooloolah Valley
 Mount Mellum
 North Maleny
 Palmview
 Parrearra
 Peachester
 Pelican Waters
 Reesville
 Shelly Beach
 Warana
 Witta
 Wootha
 Wurtulla

1 - split with the Shire of Maroochy

Population

Chairmen and mayors
 1921–1924: John H. Tytherleigh
 1924–1933: J. Grigor
 1933–1949: H. M. Bray
 1949–1955: A. Fleming
 1955–1958: Duncan MacDonald
 1958–1961: H. W. Anning
 1961–1964: Duncan MacDonald
 1964–1988: Jack Beausang
 1988–1991: Don C. Aldous
 1991–1994: Barry Gray
 1994–2000: Des J. Dwyer
 2000–2008: Don C. Aldous

See also 
 Caloundra bus station

References

Further reading
  (161 pages)
  (37 pages)

External links 

 
 

Caloundra
Sunshine Coast, Queensland
Former local government areas of Queensland
2008 disestablishments in Australia
Populated places disestablished in 2008